Mikhaylovka is a rural locality (a village) and the administrative centre of Mikhaylovsky Selsoviet, Aurgazinsky District, Bashkortostan, Russia. The population was 267 as of 2010. There are 2 streets.

Geography 
Mikhaylovka is located 22 km southwest of Tolbazy (the district's administrative centre) by road. Igenche is the nearest rural locality.

References 

Rural localities in Aurgazinsky District